Roger Appleton may refer to:

 Sir Roger Appleton, 1st Baronet (died 1614), English landowner
Roger Appleton (MP), for Maldon in 1558